TAM may refer to:

Biology
 Thioacetamide, an organosulfur compound
 Tumor-associated macrophage, a class of immune cells
 Transparent Anatomical Manikin, an educational model

Technology
 Tanque Argentino Mediano, the main battle tank of Argentina
 Technological Association Malaysia, a learned society
 Technology acceptance model, an information systems theory
 Teen Age Message, interstellar radio transmissions
 Telecom Application Map
 Telephone answering machine
 Twentieth Anniversary Macintosh, a limited-edition personal computer released by Apple in 1997

Transportation
 TAM – Transporte Aéreo Militar, Bolivian airline
 TAM Air, a Georgian airline
 Tovarna avtomobilov Maribor, a former Slovenian commercial vehicle manufacturer,
 Transports de l'Agglomération de Montpellier (TaM), a public transport company in France
 TAM Linhas Aéreas, the former name of LATAM Brasil
 IATA airport code of General Francisco Javier Mina International Airport, Tampico, Mexico
 National Rail code of Tamworth railway station, England
TAM Management, Georgia
 Tbilisi Aircraft Manufacturing, Georgia
 MTR station code of Tamar station, Hong Kong
 MRT station abbreviation of Tampines MRT station, Singapore

Characters
 Tam Lin, in a Scottish Borders ballad
 Tam Sventon, a private detective in Swedish children's novels
 River Tam, in the Firefly television series
 Simon Tam,  in the Firefly television series
 Tấm, in the Vietnamese fairy tale The Story of Tam and Cam
 Tam Song, moody secretive dude, one of the song twins in KOTLC by Shannon Messenger

Other uses
 Tam (name), a list of people with the first name, nickname or last name
 Tam cap
 Tam o' shanter (cap), bonnet from Scotland
 TAM (theatre), a theatre in North Rhine-Westphalia, Germany
 TAM Media Research, an Indian television audience measurement company
 TAM Mild Jalapeño, developed by Texas A&M University
 Toyota Astra Motor, an Indonesian automotive company
 Cyclone Tam (2006)
 The Amaz!ng Meeting, conference on critical thinking
 Total addressable market, for a product or service
 Mount Tamalpais, California, known locally as Mount Tam
 Tainan Art Museum, a museum in Tainan, Taiwan
 Tamalpais High School, California, United States, often abbreviated as Tam
 Picul or tam, a traditional Asian unit of weight
 ISO 639-3 language code of the Tamil language
 Team Action Management, programme that Albert S. Humphrey was involved with
 Tense–aspect–mood (or Tense–aspect–mood–evidentiality, abbreviated as ), refers to a group of grammatical categories in the study of linguistics.

See also
 TAM 5 or The Spirit of Butts' Farm, the first model plane to cross the Atlantic Ocean
 Tams (disambiguation)
 Tamtam (disambiguation)